Mahinda College is a Buddhist boys' school in Galle, Sri Lanka. The school was established on 1 March 1892 by the Buddhist Theosophical Society led by Colonel Henry Steel Olcott. As of May 2022 it is a national school providing primary and secondary education across 13 grades.

History 

Colonel Henry Steel Olcott, a retired United States army officer, came across a report of a religious debate between Buddhist monks and Christian clergy. He began to correspond with the Buddhist monks of Ceylon, eventually leading him to visit Ceylon.

Olcott arrived in Galle on 17 May 1880 with Helena Blavatsky, where they converted to Buddhism at the Wijeyananda temple. They founded the Buddhist Theosophical Society and set about opening up Buddhist schools such as Dharmaraja College in Kandy, Ananda College in Colombo, and Maliyadeva College in Kurunegala.With the help of John Bowles Daly, an Irish clergyman and a theosophist, Mahinda College was opened on 1 March 1892 in Galle Fort. The school was named after Arahat Mahinda, the monk who brought Buddhism to Sri Lanka.

Daly left after one year, followed by a number of principals serving for short periods. With the arrival of Frank Lee Woodward as principal in 1903, the average attendance of the school rose to 142 from 89. Also in 1903, students took the Cambridge examination, and in July 1904, G. W. Perera won a scholarship to Cambridge. By 1905 there were 246 students attending. 

Woodward had plans to relocate the college, and purchased land called “Dawatagahawatta” with a view of the Sripada (Adam's peak). On 15 January 1908 the foundation stone of the Olcott hall was lain. On 1 August 1912 the new building was ceremonially opened and became the main hall of the college. With the new location, the number of students rose to 300.

In 1919, Woodward left for Tasmania to edit and translate Buddhist texts for the Pali Text Society, London.

For the 60th anniversary of Mahinda College in 1952, a new physics laboratory was opened by the Prime Minister Dudley Senanayake on 12 September.

As of May 2022 the college provides education to 3,750 students from grades 1 to 13.  Students are divided into five groups: primary, junior, secondary, senior secondary and collegiate. The current principal of Mahinda College is Athula Wijewardhane Nanayakkara, a first-grade officer in the Sri Lanka Education Administrative Service. The college employs 175 teachers and 30 non academic staff.

Past principals

Houses 

Students are divided into four houses.

Pandukabhaya - 
Gamunu - 
Thissa - 
Parakrama - 

The houses are named after four ancient kings of Sri Lanka. Annual sporting events are held among the houses.

Lovers' Quarrel

The Lovers' Quarrel or Battle of the Lovers  is an annual cricket match played between the cricket teams of Mahinda College and Richmond College, Galle. The contest was started in 1905 under the principal of Richmond College, Rev. James Horne Darrel, and the principal of Mahinda College, Frank Lee Woodward.

As of 2019, Mahinda College has won 23 times, while Richmond College has won 24 times.The Lover's Quarrel was last won by Mahinda College in 2008, breaking a 30-year-long deadlock of draws.

Notable alumni

Notable teachers
 F. L. Woodward
 F. G. Pearce
 Arisen Ahubudu
 Ananda Samarakoon
 Edwin Ariyadasa

See also
Education in Sri Lanka
List of Mahinda College alumni

References
 A Story of Buddhist Determination: Mahinda College, Galle; Buddhist Annual of Ceylon, Vol I (1920), No. 2, p. 29-3

External links
 Official website
 Old Mahindians UK
  Mahinda college 2005 Group
 ' Asoka Weeraratna and Mahinda College - Nostalgic Memories' by W.Panditaratne

 
Buddhist schools in Sri Lanka
Boys' schools in Sri Lanka
Educational institutions established in 1892
National schools in Sri Lanka
Schools in Galle
1892 establishments in Ceylon